Maurizio Scaramucci (born 21 August 1970, in Ascoli Piceno) is an Italian retired footballer. He played as a goalkeeper. He played from 1989 for Ascoli youth teams. He made his debut in Serie A on 18 April 1992 against Cagliari. At the end of the season Genoa was relegated in Serie B, where Marcello played one match. He remained at Ascoli until 1993, then he went to play in  lower divisions.

Career
1989-1993  Ascoli 1 (0) 
1994-1996  Vis Stella Monsanpolo  
1998-1999  Pozzo 
2000-2005  Centobuchi  
2005-2006  Acquasanta   
2009  Villa Pigna

External links
 

1970 births
Living people
Italian footballers
Association football goalkeepers